Pseudotalopia rainesi is a species of sea snail, a marine gastropod mollusc in the family Trochidae.

Original description
         Poppe G.T., Tagaro S.P. & Dekker H. (2006) The Seguenziidae, Chilodontidae, Trochidae, Calliostomatidae and Solariellidae of the Philippine Islands. Visaya Supplement 2: 1-228.

References

External links
 Worms Link

rainesi
Gastropods described in 2018